Mohammad, Mohammed, Muhammad, or Muhammed Khan may refer to:

People 
Muhammad Khan (Ilkhan) (died 1338), claimant to the throne of the Ilkhanate
Mohammad Khan Qajar (1742–1797), Shah of Persia
Muhammad Khan of Ganja (d. 1780), Khan of Ganja
Muhammad Khan (Khan of Moghulistan) (died 1415), Mughlistan Khanate Khan in 1408–1415
Vali Muhammad Khan, leader of the Ashtarkhanid (Janid) dynasty in the Khanate of Bukhara from 1605 to 1611
Colonel Muhammad Khan (1919–1999), Pakistani war hero, humorist and writer
Muhammad Khan Junejo (1932–1993), Pakistani Prime Minister
Meraj Muhammad Khan (1938–2016), founding member of the Pakistan Peoples Party
Jan Mohammad Khan (?–2011), politician of Afghanistan
Muhammad Khan (athlete) (born 1934), Pakistani athlete
Mohammad Khan (athlete) (born 1911), Afghanistan athlete
Muhammad Khan (boxer) (1923-2013), Pakistani boxer
Muhammad Khan (equestrian) (born 1943), Indian Olympic equestrian
Muhammad Khan (politician) (born 1946), Pakistani politician
Muhammad Khan Toor Utmankhail (born 1946), Pakistani politician and member-elect of the Provincial Assembly of the Balochistan

Places 
Mohammad Khan, Khuzestan, village in Khuzestan Province, Iran
Mohammad Khan, Sistan and Baluchestan, village in Sistan and Baluchestan Province, Iran
Mohammad Khan, South Khorasan, village in South Khorasan Province, Iran

See also
 Khan Mohammad (1928–2009), Pakistani cricketer